Tillandsia butzii is a species of flowering plant in the genus Tillandsia. This species is native to Costa Rica and Mexico.

Cultivars
 Tillandsia 'Kacey'
 Tillandsia 'Kinkin'

References

BSI Cultivar Registry Retrieved 11 October 2009

butzii
Flora of Costa Rica
Flora of Mexico